Below is the list of blow-forward weapons

References

Firearm actions
blow forward